Charli Collier (born September 22, 1999) is an American basketball player for the Dallas Wings of the Women's National Basketball Association (WNBA). She was a First-Team All-Big 12 Conference selection in 2020 for the Texas Longhorns and was considered to be one of the top players in women's college basketball.

She earned a bronze medal while playing for the United States in the 2016 FIBA Under-17 World Championship for Women.

Collier was one of five finalists for the 2021 Lisa Leslie Award, which recognizes the top center in women's college basketball. She is a semifinalist for the Naismith Trophy and is one of 15 finalists for the Wooden Award. 

ESPN projected Collier to be the No. 1 pick in the 2021 WNBA Draft. She was drafted by the Dallas Wings as the first overall pick of the 2021 WNBA Draft.

High school career 
Collier was a four-year letter winner for Barbers Hill High School in the greater Houston area. She was ranked the nation's top player in the Class of 2018 according to Prospects Nation and the Blue Star Report, and the No. 2 Player by espnW Hoop Gurlz.  

Collier was a 2018 McDonald's All-American, a Jordan Brand Classic participant and the 2017-18 Gatorade State Girls Basketball Player of the Year. She was a USA Today All-USA Texas Girls Basketball First-Team Selection in 2018 and was a finalist for the Naismith Trophy High School Player of the Year Award.  

Collier finished her prep career with 3,539 points and 1,406 rebounds.  

As a freshman in 2014-15, she averaged 17.3 points per game, 7.3 rebounds per game and 1.7 blocks per game to help her team to a 28-4 record and a Region 5A semifinals appearance.  

As a sophomore in 2015-16, Collier averaged 24.6 points per game, 9.8 rebounds per game and 2.3 blocks per game to help Barbers Hill to a 27-8 record and an appearance in the Region 5A semifinals. She was named the 2016 UIL District 21-5A Offensive MVP and was an All-District selection. 

As a junior in 2016-17, she helped Barbers hill to a 34-5 record, including an 18-0 record in District 21-5A, as her squad advanced to the Texas Class 5A state semifinals. She averaged 23.8 points per game, 10.0 rebounds per game and 3.0 blocks per game. Collier was named to the 2017 UIL Class 5A State All-Tournament Team and was a nominee for the Gatorade Player of the Year Award.  

As a senior in 2017-18, Collier averaged 30.9 points per game, 11.5 rebounds per game, 2.3 steals per game, 2.2 blocks per game and 2.0 assists per game in leading her team to a 38-3 record and an appearance in the Class 5A, Region 3 tournament semifinals.

Texas 
Collier played for the Texas Longhorns.

As a freshman in 2018-19, Collier played in 31 games with one start, averaging 14.4 minutes per game. She averaged 4.9 points per game, Collier scored in double figures on eight occasions during the year and led the Longhorns with 20 blocks.  

Collier didn't see the playing time or success in her freshman season that she had hoped, and struggled adjusting to the timing and physicality of the collegiate game. Instead of looking to transfer, Collier turned inward and focused on improving. Through that experience, Collier has transformed herself into one of the nation's top players.

Collier had a breakout game in her team's win against No. 1 Stanford on December 22, 2019. She brought down a career-high 19 rebounds and scored a game-high 20 points in 37 minutes of play. The 19 rebounds were the eighth-most in a single game in program history. For her efforts, Collier earned espnW and USBWA National Player of the Week honors.  

Collier turned in one of the best sophomore seasons in program history, ranking third in rebounds (314) and eighth in blocks (39) among Texas sophomores all-time.  

In her junior season, Collier was the only NCAA Division I player to average at least 20.0 points per game and 12.0 rebounds per game. She has increased her points per game average by more than eight points from her sophomore to her junior season. Collier has recorded 20 or more points on 16 occasions as a junior, including a career-high 44 points against North Texas on November 29, 2020, marking the most by a Texas player since 1994.  
Collier had a breakout sophomore season in 2019-20, earning First-Team All-Big 12 Conference accolades. She started all 30 games at the center position for the Longhorns, playing 29.8 minutes per game. Collier was tied for the team lead in scoring (13.1 points per game) and led the Longhorns in rebounding (10.5 rebounds per game). She ranked 20th nationally in rebounds per game (10.5) and 23rd in total rebounds (314).  

Collier was one of only six players in the Big 12 Conference that season to average a double-double on the year. She ranked 16th nationally in double-doubles with 16 and she was one of only four players in program history to average a points-rebounds double-double for a single season.

National team career 
Collier was a member of the United States U-17 Women's National Team that won a bronze medal at the 2016 World Championships. She also participated in the 2017 USA U19 World Cup Team Trials and the 2015 USA U16 National Team Trials. She also represented the United States in the inaugural FIBA 3x3 Women’s Series in the summer of 2019.

WNBA career statistics

Regular season 

|-
| style="text-align:left;"| 2021
| style="text-align:left;"| Dallas
| 28 || 18 || 12.3 || .465 || .000 || .696 || 3.6 || 0.2 || 0.1 || 0.2 || 0.5 || 3.4
|-
| style="text-align:left;"| 2022
| style="text-align:left;"| Dallas
| 17 || 0 || 4.6 || .444 || .000 || .714 || 0.6 || 0.1 || 0.1 || 0.0 || 0.6 || 2.0
|-
| style="text-align:left;"| Career
| style="text-align:left;"| 2 years, 1 team
| 45 || 18 || 9.4 || .460 || .000 || .703 || 2.5 || 0.2 || 0.1 || 0.1 || 0.5 || 2.9

Personal life 

Collier is the daughter of Ponda and the late Elliott Collier. She has a brother, Casey, who plays football for the University of Southern California. Her mother played basketball at Southwestern University and her father played basketball at Eastern Montana College. 

Collier is interested in pursuing a career in sports broadcasting following her playing career. Collier has hosted her own online show in preparation for her future career, and has interviewed high-profile guests like Kevin Durant of the Brooklyn Nets. 

Growing up, Collier's family was friends with Retha Swindell, the University of Texas' all-time career rebounds leader and the first African-American woman to play basketball for the Longhorns. Collier interviewed Swindell for Longhorn Network during the 2020 season to discuss their common bond.

References 

1999 births
Living people
American women's basketball players
Basketball players from Texas
Centers (basketball)
Dallas Wings draft picks
Dallas Wings players
McDonald's High School All-Americans
Power forwards (basketball)
Sportspeople from the Houston metropolitan area
Texas Longhorns women's basketball players
Women's National Basketball Association first-overall draft picks